Michael Patrick King (born September 14, 1954) is an American director, writer, and producer. He is best known for directing and writing for Sex and the City and its film adaptations, and for co-creating the television comedies The Comeback, 2 Broke Girls, and AJ and the Queen.

Life and career
King was born to a Roman Catholic Irish-American family in Scranton, Pennsylvania. He attended Mercyhurst University in Erie, Pennsylvania, for three years.

In 1975, King moved to New York, did comedy, and wrote plays. He also was a member of a comedy improv group called The Broadway Local which mostly performed at Manhattan Punch Line Theatre. They were considered to be the in-house Improv group there.
 
He eventually moved to Los Angeles, where he found work writing for the television series Murphy Brown, and was nominated for several Emmys. He wrote for the HBO show, The Comeback, as well as for broadcast shows Will & Grace, Good Advice, and Cybill. He has an acting role on the HBO special Larry David: Curb Your Enthusiasm as Larry David's publicist.

He may be best known for his work on the HBO series Sex and the City, which was created by Darren Star. King wrote all the season premieres and finales of Sex and the City (except its pilot, written by Star, and the fifth-season finale, which King co-wrote with Cindy Chupack). He directed the show's film adaptation, and its follow-up, Sex and the City 2. He is featured on The Other Network Writers Room, an audio series for aspiring comedy writers. In 2008, his production company signed a deal with DreamWorks.

He is openly gay and lives in Greenwich Village. He owns Arcade Productions, a production company.

Filmography

See also
 LGBT culture in New York City
 List of LGBT people from New York City

References

External links
 
 Archive of the original Sex and the City newspaper columns
 Un-Cabaret
 The Other Network Writers Room
 

1954 births
American male screenwriters
American television directors
Television producers from Pennsylvania
Primetime Emmy Award winners
American gay writers
LGBT people from Pennsylvania
American Roman Catholics
Living people
American people of Irish descent
Screenwriters from Pennsylvania
LGBT film directors
LGBT television directors
Writers from Scranton, Pennsylvania